Neriacanthus is a genus of South American plants in the family Acanthaceae. It contains the following species (but this list may be incomplete):
 Neriacanthus harlingii Wassh.

Acanthaceae
Acanthaceae genera
Taxonomy articles created by Polbot